Will Dean (born June 10, 1987) is a Canadian rower. He won two gold medal at the 2015 Pan American Games in the men's quadruple sculls and men's eight events.

He was part of the Canadian men's four who reached the B final at the 2012 Summer Olympics.

In 2016, Dean qualified for the 2016 Summer Olympics by finishing in second place (and last qualifying position). in the men's quadruple sculls event at the last chance qualification event in Lausanne, Switzerland.

References

External links
 
 

1987 births
Living people
Rowers at the 2015 Pan American Games
Pan American Games gold medalists for Canada
Canadian male rowers
Rowers from British Columbia
Sportspeople from Kelowna
Rowers at the 2016 Summer Olympics
Olympic rowers of Canada
Rowers at the 2012 Summer Olympics
Pan American Games medalists in rowing
Medalists at the 2015 Pan American Games
21st-century Canadian people